Palais des Sports de Dijon (also known as Palais des Sports Jean-Michel Geoffroy) is an indoor sporting arena that is located in Dijon, France.  The arena has a seating capacity of 5,000 for basketball games.

History
The arena was one of the venues of the 1999 FIBA EuroBasket. It has also been used as the home venue of the Jeanne d'Arc Dijon Bourgogne professional basketball team.

Basketball venues in France
Buildings and structures in Dijon
Handball venues in France
Indoor arenas in France
Sports venues in Côte-d'Or